Jack Owen (born December 6, 1967) is an American guitarist and a member of the death metal band Six Feet Under. He was one of the founding members of Cannibal Corpse. He stayed with the band from their formation in 1988 until 2004 when he left because he wanted to move on, as stated in the Centuries of Torment DVD. Later that year though, he was hired by Deicide—another influential and long-running Florida death metal band—with whom he recorded four albums. He left the band in 2016.

In 2007, Owen played shows with Adrift before joining Order of Ennead at times when their guitarist, John Li, was unavailable. In 2009 Owen played guitar for a white power band Attack on their album Fade Away, though he claimed it was merely session work and he was not informed of their racist beliefs beforehand.

Discography

Cannibal Corpse 

Eaten Back to Life (1990)
Butchered at Birth (1991)
Tomb of the Mutilated (1992)
The Bleeding (1994)
Vile (1996)
Gallery of Suicide (1998)
Bloodthirst (1999)
Gore Obsessed (2002)
The Wretched Spawn (2004)

Deicide 
The Stench of Redemption (2006)
Till Death Do Us Part (2008)
To Hell with God (2011)
In the Minds of Evil (2013)

Six Feet Under 
Nightmares of the Decomposed (2020)

Adrift 
Absolution (2007)

Estuary 
 Played bass live in 2007 on European tour.

Attack 
Fade Away 2009

Grave Descent 
Grave Descent  MCD 2011

Tennessee Murder Club 
''Sessions, "The Pact" 2013 Full Length Release

References

External links
 https://web.archive.org/web/20130902111237/http://www.html.forrestfogarty.us/

American heavy metal guitarists
Death metal musicians
Living people
Cannibal Corpse members
1967 births
People from Akron, New York
Seven-string guitarists
American male guitarists
20th-century American guitarists
Six Feet Under (band) members
Deicide (band) members